The 2017 Atlantic City mayoral election was held on November 7, 2017 to elect the Mayor of Atlantic City, New Jersey. Primary elections were held on June 6. Incumbent Republican Don Guardian lost re-election to a second term to Democratic city councilman Frank Gilliam.

Republican primary

Candidates
On March 18, the Atlantic City Republican County Committee endorsed Don Guardian for Mayor, with him receiving 5 votes, Joseph Polillo 2 votes, and three members not voting. Subsequently, Polillo dropped out of the primary and decided to continue running for Mayor as an independent.

Declared
 Don Guardian, incumbent Mayor

Withdrawn
 Joseph Polillo, retired license inspector and perennial candidate (running as an independent)

Results

Democratic primary

Candidates
On April 3, the Atlantic City Democratic Committee endorsed Frank Gilliam for Mayor, with him receiving 27 votes, Marty Small 3 votes, and Fareed Abdullah 1 vote.

Declared
 Fareed Abdullah, substitute teacher and candidate for City Council in 2009 and 2013
 Frank Gilliam, City Councilman
 Marty Small, City Council President
 Jimmy Whitehead, Navy veteran

Results
Despite narrowly losing the primary day voting to Small by a count of 1,529–1,429, Gilliam was in the lead overall thanks to a substantial advantage on absentee ballots (694–209). Small sought a recount, which was granted by a state Superior Court judge.  However, little changed in the recount and the result was upheld.

Independents and third parties

Candidates

Declared
 Henry "Hank" Green (Green), radio show host and producer
 Joseph Polillo (Independent), retired license inspector and perennial candidate

General election

Results

References

Atlantic City
Mayoral elections in Atlantic City, New Jersey
Atlantic City
Atlantic City